Faisselle is a non-protected French cheese made of raw milk from cows, goats, or sheep. The name comes from the mold in which the cheese is strained: .

Production 
Faisselle is traditionally produced in the centre of France, but because its name is not protected, it can be produced anywhere else in the country. The cheese produced elsewhere uses pasteurized milk to make it appealing to a wider customer base.

Composition 

Consumption 
Faisselle is often eaten as a savory dessert served with salt, pepper, and either chives or shallots. It is also eaten as a sweet dessert, served with sugar or honey. It is used as an ingredient in a number of dessert dishes, including cakes and tarts.

See also

References

External links 

French cheeses
Cow's-milk cheeses
Goat's-milk cheeses
Sheep's-milk cheeses
Cheese dishes